Rhoda Moy Crawford (born 1989) is a Jamaican politician, who is currently the Jamaica Labour Party Member of Parliament for Manchester Central. She was first elected in the landslide 2020 general election.

Political career 
Crawford defeated incumbent MP Peter Bunting.

References

External links 
 Rhoda Moy-Crawford on Twitter

Living people
1989 births
21st-century Jamaican politicians
21st-century Jamaican women politicians
Members of the House of Representatives of Jamaica
People from Manchester Parish
Jamaica Labour Party politicians
Members of the 14th Parliament of Jamaica